Transgenic Research, international in scope, is a bimonthly, peer-reviewed, scientific journal, published by Springer. The co-editors-in-chief are Johannes Buyel  and Simon Lillico.

Scope
Transgenic Research focuses on transgenic and genome edited higher organisms. Manuscripts emphasizing biotechnological applications are strongly encouraged. Intellectual property, ethical issues, societal impact and regulatory aspects also fall within the scope of the journal. Transgenic Research aims to bridge the gap between fundamental and applied science in molecular biology and biotechnology for the plant and animal academic and associated industry communities. 

Transgenic Research publishes

Research
Should describe novel research involving the production, characterization and application of genetically altered animals or plants. Reports of transient results may be considered if they have a clear focus or application in permanently modified multicellular organisms.

Reviews
Should critically summarize the current state-of-the-art of the subject in a dispassionate way. Authors are requested to contact a Board Member before submission. Reviews should not be descriptive; rather they should present the most up-to-date information on the subject in a dispassionate and critical way. Perspective Reviews which can address new or controversial aspects are encouraged.

Commentaries
Similar to reviews, this article type should refer to one or several recently published articles or topics currently under debate in the respective scientific community. The Editorial Board should be contacted before submission as described for reviews.

Brief Communications
Should be short reports describing substantial developments in experiments involving transgenic or genome-edited multi-cellular organisms that are highly relevant for the research community and require a fast dissemination.

Methods
Should describe in detail the development of new methods to generate, analyze or select transgenic or genome-edited multicellular organisms in a way that is advantageous compared to the current state of the art, including explicit benchmarking against existing gold-standards where appropriate.

Protocols
Should provide an in-depth, step-by-step description of relevant methods that allow successful reproduction in other laboratories without the need for additional details or information. Providing a brief description of typical results as well as a precise trouble-shooting guide is expected.

Abstracting and indexing
This journal is listed in the following databases:

Thomoson Reuters databases:
Biochemistry and Biophysics Citation Index
BIOSIS - Biological Abstracts
Biotechnology Citation Index
Current Contents/ Life Sciences
Journal Citation Reports/Science Edition
Science Citation Index
SciSearch
CABI Direct
CAB Abstracts
CAB International
Global Health
EBSCO
Environment Index
Elsevier Biobase
Current Awareness in Biological Sciences (CABS)
EMBASE
EMBiology
Chemical Abstracts Service (CAS) - CASSI
CSA/Proquest
Derwent Biotechnology Resource
Gale
Google Scholar
IBIDS
OCLC
PASCAL
PubMed/MEDLINE
Scopus
Summon by Serial Solutions
VINITI Database RAS

References

External links
International Society for Transgenic Technologies

Molecular and cellular biology journals
Springer Science+Business Media academic journals
Publications established in 1991
English-language journals
Bimonthly journals
Biotechnology journals